Paul McLean (born 25 July 1964) in a Scottish former footballer, who played for Queen's Park, Motherwell, Ayr United and Stranraer.

External links 

1964 births
Living people
People from Johnstone
Association football midfielders
Queen's Park F.C. players
Motherwell F.C. players
Ayr United F.C. players
Stranraer F.C. players
Scottish Football League players
Footballers from Renfrewshire
Scottish footballers